KGVL (1400 AM, "EZ Rock 105.9") is a radio station broadcasting a classic hits format located in Greenville, Texas, United States. The station is currently owned by Christie Lynn Tate and Jonathan Tate Ellis, through licensee E Radio Network, LLC. KGVL also retransmits its signal on 105.9 FM K290AP, which is licensed to Commerce.

History
KGVL signed on in 1946 on 1400 kHz in Greenville Texas. The facility was built by legendary broadcast engineer Truett Kimzey, who in the early 1930s gained fame as the original announcer for the Light Crust Doughboys on KFJZ in Fort Worth ("The Light Crust Doughboys are on the air!") and was one of the earliest engineers to transmit experimental television broadcasts. KGVL originally operated as a "full-service" station, with middle-of-the-road music, local news and sports, live coverage of local events, and Mutual Network and Texas State Network programming. The station's primary owner was Leo Hackney, who managed the station into the 1980s.

The station was formerly owned by Cumulus Media, and was sold to Hunt County Radio, LLC. On October 17, 2017, Hunt County Radio contracted to sell KGVL and KIKT to E Radio Network, LLC in an all-cash transaction. The sale was consummated on March 14, 2018 at a price of $500,000. KGVL is the only radio station in the Dallas-Fort Worth area to air American Top 40 with Casey Kasem (the 1970's or 1980's).

Format history

Country music 1946–?
Adult Standards ?–1987
Adult Contemporary 1987–?
News Talk ?–1994
Country music 1994–1999
Oldies 1999–? (14K Gold)
Spanish 2005–2007; Radio Exitos 1400 Spanish on weekends only
News Talk ?–2009 (1400 KGVL News/Talk/Sports)
Classic Country 2009–2010 (1400 The Boot)
Oldies 2010–November 2013 (Big 14 GVL)
Classic Country November 2013–February 2018 (105.9 & 1400)
Classic Hits February 2018–present (EZ Rock 105.9)

See also
 EZ Rock - It's also formally name as popular radio network branding that serving some of Canadian cities like Edmonton (1995-2011), Prince Rupert (2011-2021), St. Catharines (2001-2020), Toronto (1995-2009 as CJEZ-FM) and other stations. Note: Ownership it's different in Canada and all of stations are now discontinuing after on May 18, 2021.

References

External links

 DFW Radio/TV History

GVL
Radio stations established in 1946
1946 establishments in Texas